Francesco Pietrasanta was an Italian fencer. He competed in the individual foil and sabre events at the 1912 Summer Olympics.

References

Year of birth missing
Year of death missing
Italian male fencers
Olympic fencers of Italy
Fencers at the 1912 Summer Olympics